Chaksu is  a municipality in Jaipur district  in the state of Rajasthan, India. The town is situated at a distance of 40 km from Jaipur on National Highway 52. The town is also one of the 13 tehsil headquarters of Jaipur District. Chaksu is also a legislative assembly seat of Rajasthan Vidhan Sabha and the current MLA of Chaksu is Ved Prakash Solanki.

Gujjars, Meenas and Bairwas are the majority caste in Chaksu and nearby villages.

Connectivity
Chaksu connected via road from Kota-Tonk, Jaipur, Phagi-Dudu, Dausa-Lalsot. Jaipur-Mumbai rail route also passing from Chaksu railway station. Nearest airport is Jaipur International Airport – Jaipur just 25 km from Chaksu.

Demographics
As of the 2011 India census, Chaksu tehsil had  population of 2,23,634 and Chaksu town had population of 33,432.

References

Cities and towns in Jaipur district